Alberto Orzan (24 July 1931 – 9 August 2022) was an Italian footballer who played as a defender. He represented the Italy national team four times, the first time being on 11 November 1956, the occasion of a 1955–60 Central European International Cup match against Switzerland in a 1–1 away draw. He was the last surviving player from the 1956–57 European Cup final.

Honours 
Fiorentina
 Serie A: 1955–56
 Coppa Italia: 1960–61
 European Cup Winners' Cup: 1960–61

References 

1931 births
2022 deaths
People from the Province of Gorizia
Italian footballers
Association football defenders
Italy international footballers
Serie A players
Udinese Calcio players
ACF Fiorentina players